Lueddemannia is a genus of orchids found from Venezuela to Peru. Three species are currently recognized as of June 2014:

Lueddemannia dalessandroi (Dodson) G.Gerlach & M.H.Weber - Ecuador
Lueddemannia pescatorei (Lindl.) Linden & Rchb.f. - Venezuela, Colombia, Ecuador, Peru
Lueddemannia striata G.Gerlach & M.H.Weber - Peru

References

External links

Orchids of South America
Stanhopeinae genera
Stanhopeinae